Pharr Mounds is a Middle Woodland period archaeological site located near Tupelo in parts of Itawamba and Prentiss counties in northern Mississippi. This complex was made of earthwork mounds.

The complex of eight dome-shaped, tumulus burial mounds was in use during the Miller 1 phase of the Miller culture. These were constructed as earthwork mounds between 1 and 200 CE. The complex is considered to be one of the largest and most important sites from this era. It was listed on the National Register of Historic Places in 1978 as part of the Natchez Trace Parkway at milepost 286.7.

Site description
The site is located at the headwaters of the Tombigbee River, a rugged, hilly area with many broad, swampy streams. It is named for "Pharr Flats", a wide, gently rolling terrace overlooking the confluence of Little Brown and Mackeys creeks. The site features eight dome-shaped mounds of differing sizes, several of which have been nearly flattened by plowing and cultivation during European-American farming.  The mounds in the Pharr Mounds site are found over an area of 90 acres of land.

Archaeology
In 1966 Charles Bohannon, an archaeologist for the National Park Service, supervised an excavation of four of the mounds. The excavators found fire pits and low clay platforms at the base of the mounds. They also found human remains, some cremated, as well as various ceremonial artifacts.

Many of the artifacts were made from non-local materials, such as Great Lakes copper and greenstone, galena, and mica, demonstrating the reach of trading through the Hopewell exchange system. These artifacts, which include copper ear-spools and a greenstone platform pipe, show the connection of the local peoples with the larger Middle Woodland period world of the time, reaching to the Great Lakes.

See also
 Bynum Mound and Village Site
 Grand Gulf Mound
 Woodland period

References

External links

 Pharr Mounds on Flickr
 Archaeology of prehistoric native America: an encyclopedia

Archaeological sites on the National Register of Historic Places in Mississippi
Miller culture
Mounds in Mississippi
National Register of Historic Places in Itawamba County, Mississippi
National Register of Historic Places in Prentiss County, Mississippi
Protected areas of Itawamba County, Mississippi
Protected areas of Mississippi
Protected areas of Prentiss County, Mississippi